Andronikos I Komnenos ( – 12 September 1185), Latinized as Andronicus I Comnenus, was Byzantine emperor from 1183 to 1185. He was the son of Isaac Komnenos and the grandson of the emperor Alexios I. In later Byzantine historiography, Andronikos I became known under the epithet "Misophaes" ("Hater of Sunlight") in reference to the great number of enemies he had blinded.

Early years
Andronikos Komnenos was born around 1118. Most of what is known of him is from the writings of the historian Niketas Choniates, certain passages in a work by Eustathios, 'The Capture of Thessaloniki', or inferred by later historians of the Byzantine Empire. He was handsome and eloquent, active, hardy, courageous, a great general and an able politician, but also licentious. His early years were spent alternately in pleasure and in military service.

In 1141, he was taken captive by the Seljuk Turks and remained in their hands for a year. On being ransomed, he went to Constantinople, where he was held at the court of his first cousin Emperor Manuel I Komnenos, to whom he was a great favourite. Here the charms of his niece, Eudoxia, attracted him and she became his mistress. In 1152, accompanied by Eudoxia, he set out for an important command in Cilicia. After his defeat at the Battle of Mamistra, an attack upon Mopsuestia, he returned but was again appointed to the command of a province. This second post he seems also to have left after a short interval, for he appeared again in Constantinople and narrowly escaped death at the hands of the brothers of Eudoxia.

Exile
About 1153, a conspiracy against Emperor Manuel in which Andronikos participated was discovered, and he was imprisoned. After repeated unsuccessful attempts, he escaped in 1165. After passing through many dangers, including captivity in Vlach territory, he reached Kiev, where his cousin Yaroslav Osmomysl of Galicia held court. While under the protection of Yaroslav, Andronikos formed an alliance with the Emperor Manuel I, and with a Galician army he joined Manuel in the invasion of Hungary, assisting at the siege of Semlin. The campaign was successful, and Andronikos returned to Constantinople with Manuel I in 1168; a year later, however, Andronikos refused to take the oath of allegiance to Béla of Hungary, whom Manuel desired to become his successor. Andronikos was removed from court but received the province of Cilicia.

Still under the displeasure of the emperor, Andronikos fled to the court of Prince Raymond of Antioch. While residing here he captivated and seduced the beautiful daughter of the Prince, Philippa, sister of the Empress Maria. The emperor was again angered by this dishonour, sent Constantine Kalamanos to woo Philippa (unsuccessfully), and Andronikos was compelled to flee. He took refuge with King Amalric of Jerusalem, whose favour he gained, and who invested him with the Lordship of Beirut. In Jerusalem he saw Theodora Komnene, the beautiful widow of King Baldwin III and niece of Emperor Manuel. Although Andronikos was at that time fifty-six years old, age had not diminished his charms, and Theodora became the next victim of his artful seduction. To avoid the vengeance of the emperor, she fled with Andronikos to the court of Nur ad-Din, the sultan of Damascus. Feeling unsafe there, they continued their perilous journey through the Caucasus and Anatolia. They were well received by King George III of Georgia, whose sister had probably been the first wife of Andronikos.

Andronikos was granted estates in Kakhetia, in the east of Georgia. In 1173 or 1174, he accompanied the Georgian army on an expedition to Shirvan up to the Caspian shores, where George recaptured the fortress of Shabaran from the invaders from Darband for his cousin, the Shirvanshah Akhsitan I. Finally, Andronikos and Theodora settled in the ancestral lands of the Komnenoi at Oinaion, on the shores of the Black Sea, between Trebizond and Sinope. While Andronikos was on one of his incursions into Trebizond, his castle was surprised by the governor of that province, and Theodora and her two children were captured and sent to Constantinople. To obtain their release, Andronikos in early 1180 made abject submission to the emperor and, appearing in chains before him, besought pardon. This he obtained, and he was allowed to retire with Theodora into banishment at Oinaion.

Emperor
In 1180, the Emperor Manuel died and was succeeded by his ten-year-old son Alexios II, who was under the guardianship of his mother, Maria of Antioch. Her Latin origins and culture led to creeping resentment from her Greek subjects. They had felt insulted by the Western tastes of Manuel, watching much of their wealth and opportunity being absorbed by Latin merchants and their trade concessions. The regency of Manuel's Frankish widow saw increasing Latin favor and tensions rising. Andronikos saw this Latin dissatisfaction as an opportunity to seize the crown for himself, leaving his retirement in 1182 and marching to Constantinople with an army that (according to non-Byzantine sources) included Muslim contingents.

Alexios attempted to negotiate, and sent George Xiphilinos (a future patriarch) to Andronikos' camp, offering a pardon and high office. In the event, Xiphilinos betrayed the prōtosebastos, and Andronikos rejected the offer, insisting instead that the prōtosebastos retire and be held accountable for his administration, and the empress-dowager be confined to a convent. The defection of the commander of the Byzantine navy, megas doux Andronikos Kontostephanos, and the defeat and defection of his cousin general Andronikos Angelos, played a key role in allowing the rebellious forces to enter Constantinople.

The arrival of Andronikos Komnenos was soon followed by a massacre of the city's Latin inhabitants, who virtually controlled its economy, resulting in the deaths of thousands of Westerners. He was believed to have arranged the poisoning of Alexios II's elder sister Maria the Porphyrogenita and her husband Renier of Montferrat, although Maria herself had encouraged him to intervene; the poisoner was said to be the eunuch Pterygeonites. Soon afterwards Andronikos had the Empress Maria imprisoned and then killed – forcing a signature from the child Emperor Alexios to put his mother to death – by Pterygeonites and the hetaireiarches Constantine Tripsychos. Alexios II was compelled to acknowledge Andronikos as colleague in the empire in front of the crowd on the terrace of the Church of Christ of the Chalkè and was then quickly put to death in turn; the killing was carried out by Tripsychos, Theodore Dadibrenos, and Stephen Hagiochristophorites.

In 1183, sixty-five-year old Andronikos married twelve-year-old Agnes of France, daughter of King Louis VII of France and his third wife Adèle of Champagne – Agnes had been betrothed to Alexios II. By November 1183, Andronikos had associated his younger legitimate son John Komnenos on the throne. In 1184, a Venetian embassy visited Constantinople, and an agreement was reached that compensation of 1,500 gold pieces would be paid for the losses incurred in 1171.

The reign of Andronikos was characterized by his harsh measures. He resolved to suppress many abuses but above all things to check feudalism and limit the power of the nobles, who were rivals for his throne. He attempted to reform the decaying political system by forbidding the sale of offices, punishing corrupt officials (often brutally) but above all, he moved to check the power of the feudal landowners. The people, who felt the severity of his laws, at the same time acknowledged their justice and found themselves protected from the rapacity of their superiors, who had grown corrupt under the safety and opulence of Manuel I's rule. Andronikos became increasingly paranoid and violent, however, and the Empire descended into a terror state.. In September 1185, he ordered the execution of all prisoners, exiles, and their families for collusion with the invaders. The aristocrats, in turn, were infuriated against him, and there were several revolts.

The stories of chaos led to an invasion by William II of the Kingdom of Sicily. William landed in Epirus with a strong force of 200 ships and 80,000 men, including 5,000 knights, and marched as far as Thessalonica, which he took and pillaged ruthlessly (7,000 Greeks died). Andronikos hastily assembled five different armies to stop the Sicilian army from reaching Constantinople, but his forces failed to stand and retreated to the outlying hills. Andronikos also assembled a fleet of 100 ships to stop the Norman fleet from entering the Sea of Marmara. The invaders were finally driven out in 1186 by his successor, Isaac Angelos.

Death

Andronikos seems then to have resolved to exterminate the aristocracy, and his plans were nearly successful. But on 11 September 1185, during his absence from the capital, Stephen Hagiochristophorites, his lieutenant, moved to arrest Isaac Angelos, whose loyalty was suspect. Angelos killed Hagiochristophorites and took refuge in the church of Hagia Sophia. He appealed to the populace, and a tumult arose that spread rapidly over the whole city.

When Andronikos arrived he found that Isaac had been proclaimed emperor. The deposed emperor attempted to escape in a boat with his wife Agnes and his mistress, but they were captured (though some claim that Andronikos survived and managed to escape to the self-proclaimed kingdom of Cyprus). Angelos handed him over to the city mob and for three days he was exposed to their fury and resentment, remaining for that period tied to a post and beaten. His right hand was cut off, his teeth and hair were pulled out, one of his eyes was gouged out, and, among many other sufferings, boiling water was thrown in his face, punishment probably associated with his handsomeness and life of licentiousness. At last he was led to the Hippodrome of Constantinople and hung by his feet between two pillars. Two Latin soldiers competed as to whose sword would penetrate his body more deeply, and he was, according to the representation of his death, torn apart; his remains were left unburied and were visible for several years afterwards. He died on 12 September 1185. At the news of the Emperor's death, his son and co-emperor, John, was murdered by his own troops in Thrace. Andronikos I was the last of the Komnenoi to rule Constantinople, although his grandsons Alexios and David founded the Empire of Trebizond in 1204. Their branch of the dynasty was known as the "Great Komnenoi" (Megalokomnenoi).

Family
Andronikos I Komnenos was married twice and had numerous mistresses. By his first wife, whose name is not known, he had three children:
 Manuel Komnenos (1145 – after 1185), served as an ambassador under Manuel I, and opposed his father's policies when he seized power. Due to this opposition, as well as adherence to the AIMA prophecy, he was not named successor, but awarded the rank of sebastokrator instead. Nevertheless, he was blinded by the new regime following the downfall of his father, and disappears from the sources thereafter. From his marriage to the Georgian princess Rusudan, he was the father of Alexios I and David Komnenos, the founders of the Empire of Trebizond and of the dynasty of the Grand Komnenoi, the only male-line descendants of the Komnenian house.
 John Komnenos (1159–1185), as a child he accompanied his father during his exile, and after his rise to the throne was crowned co-emperor in November 1183. After the overthrow of Andronikos, he was executed in September 1185. 
 Maria Komnene (born ), married Theodore Synadenos in 1182, but he died shortly after; her second husband was a certain Romanos, whose rapacity and terrorization of the populace during the defence of Dyrrhachium against the Normans in 1185 contributed to the fall of the city. The fate of Maria and her husband after Andronikos' downfall is unknown.

By his niece and mistress Theodora Komnene, Andronikos I had the following children:
 Alexios Komnenos (1170 – ), his early life is obscure, he fled to Georgia after 1185, where he married into the local nobility. The noble family of Andronikashvili claim descent from him, and he may have been the forefather of the provincial rulers of Alastaneli.
 Irene Komnene (born 1171), she was married to the sebastokrator Alexios Komnenos, an illegitimate son of Emperor Manuel I Komnenos, in October 1183. Her husband became involved in a conspiracy against Andronikos and was blinded and imprisoned, while Irene entered a monastery.
His second marriage to Anna of France, and his liaisons with his other mistresses, remained childless.

In popular culture 
Andronikos is the main protagonist in Michael Arnold's Against the Fall of Night (Garden City, New York: Doubleday 1975), as well as Ange Vlachos' Their Most Serene Majesties (Vanguard Press, 1964).

He is mentioned in the Louis L'Amour medieval historical novel, The Walking Drum, with his gruesome death foreseen by the protagonist in a vision.

He is among the main characters of the historical novel Agnes of France (1980) by Greek writer Kostas Kyriazis (b. 1920). The novel describes the events of the reigns of Manuel I, Alexios II and Andronikos I through the eyes of Agnes. The novel ends with the death of Andronikos.

Andronikos was portrayed in the novel Baudolino by Umberto Eco, with much detail being given to his grisly end.

See also

 Andrey Bogolyubsky
 List of Byzantine emperors

Notes

References

 
 
 
 
 https://www.britannica.com/biography/Andronicus-I-Comnenus

Further reading

 Gibbon, Edward. The Decline and Fall of the Roman Empire, Chapter 48.
 Grünbart, Michael, 'Die Macht des Historiographen – Andronikos (I.) Komnenos und sein Bild', in Zbornik Radova Vizantinoloskog Instituta 48, 2011, pp. 75–85
 Harris, Jonathan, Byzantium and the Crusades, Bloomsbury, 2nd ed., 2014. 
 Harris, Jonathan, 'Collusion with the infidel as a pretext for military action against Byzantium', in Clash of Cultures: the Languages of Love and Hate, ed. Sarah Lambert and Helen Nicholson, Brepols, 2012, pp. 99–117. 
 
 Mihai Tiuliumeanu, Andronic I Comnenul, Iași, 2000. 
 
 Eustathios of Thessaloniki 'The Capture of Thessaloniki' (Byzantina Australiensia 8), Canberra 1988.
 The full text of a lecture by John Melville-Jones on the life of this emperor is located at:   . It is accompanied by an extensive bibliography.

Andronikos 01
Byzantine people of the Crusades
12th-century Byzantine emperors
Andronikos Komnenos
Andronikos Komnenos
Eastern Orthodox monarchs
Executed Byzantine people
Executed monarchs
Byzantine people of the Byzantine–Seljuk wars
People executed by dismemberment
Lynching deaths
12th-century executions by the Byzantine Empire